was a village located in Gunma, Japan during the years 1889 to 1954.

History
Furumaki Village was formed in 1889 as a result of the merging of three villages: Arima Village, Handa Village, and Yagihara Village. On April 1, 1954, Furumaki Village merged with Kanashima Village, Shibukawa Town, and Toyoaki Village to become Shibukawa City.

Today
The area formerly held as Furumaki Village is now a part of Shibukawa City, and the name of the former village is retained in the name of an elementary school and a junior high school.

Dissolved municipalities of Gunma Prefecture
Shibukawa, Gunma